James Edward Hunt (June 20, 1903 – May 9, 1999) was an American athletic trainer.  A native of Minnesota, he was the head athletic trainer for the University of Minnesota Golden Gophers from 1942 to 1946 and for the University of Michigan Wolverines football team from 1947 to 1967. He was known for his innovations in developing protective equipment and was reported to be "the first trainer to use fiberglass to help prevent serious injuries." In 1951, he was selected by the Helms Foundation Hall of Fame as the Trainer of the Year, and in 1957, he was elected as the president of the National Athletic Trainers Association. He retired in July 1968 at age 65. He died in 1999 at age 95 and was buried at Saint Thomas Catholic Cemetery in Ann Arbor.

See also
List of Michigan Wolverines football trainers

References

1903 births
1999 deaths
People from Sibley County, Minnesota
University of Michigan faculty
Athletic trainers